Brown's Mill may refer to:
Battle of Brown's Mill
Brown's Mill, California, former name of Stafford, Humboldt County, California

See also 
 Browns Mill, Virginia